Georg is a male given name in mostly Northern European countries and may refer to:

In creative culture
 Georg, Baron von Ortzen, German poet and author 
 Georg Baselt, German actor 
 Georg Blomstedt, Swedish actor 
 Georg Böhm, German organist
 Georg Büchner, German playwright
 Georg Brandl Egloff, American composer
 Georg Fabricius, Protestant German poet
 Georg Gerster, Swiss photographer
 George Frideric Handel (Georg Friederich Händel in German), German composer
 Georg Philipp Harsdorffer, German poet
 Georg Løkkeberg, Norwegian actor
 Georg Maier, German actor and theatre director
 Georg Listing, bassist for the German Rock Band Tokio Hotel
 Georg Malmstén, Finnish singer, composer
 Georg Matthias Monn, Austrian composer
 Georg Muffat, French composer
 Georg Ots, Estonian opera singer
 Georg Solti, Hungarian conductor
 Georg Stahlberg, Estonian opera singer and music pedagogue
 Georg Stiernhielm, Swedish poet
 Georg Philipp Telemann, German composer
 Georg von Trapp, headed the Austrian singing von Trapp family
 Georg Tintner, Austrian conductor
 Georg Trakl, Austrian poet
 Georg Trump, German graphics, typeface and postage stamp designer
 Georg Joseph Vogler, German composer
 Georg Christoph Wagenseil, Austrian composer
 Georg Hólm, bassist for the Icelandic post-rock band Sigur Rós

In science
 Georg von Békésy, Hungarian biophysicist, Nobel Prize laureate
 Georg Brandt, Swedish chemist and mineralogist
 Georg Cantor, German mathematician
 Georg Groddeck, German physician whom Freud credits for the Id
 Georg Wilhelm Friedrich Hegel, German philosopher
 Georg Hartung (c. 1822 - c. 1891), a pioneering German geologist
 Georg Major, German Lutheran theologian
 Georg Mohr, Danish mathematician
 Georg Ohm, German physicist
 Georg Pawer (Bauer), German scholar and scientist, the father of mineralogy
 Georg Hermann Quincke, German physicist
 Georg Joachim Rheticus, cartographer and scientific instrument maker
 Georg Wilhelm Richmann, Russian physicist
 Georg Ernst Stahl, German physician and chemist
 Georg Steller, German naturalist
 Georg Sverdrup, Norwegian philologist
 Georg Wittig, German chemist, Nobel Prize laureate
 Georg Alexander Pick, Austrian mathematician

In politics
 Georg Friedrich, Prince of Prussia
 Georg Andersson (politician) (born 1936), Swedish politician 
 Georg Bissmark (1871–1941), Swedish jurist and politician
 Georg Gothein (1857–1940), German politician
 Georg von Hertling, Chancellor of Germany
 Georg Michaelis, Chancellor of Germany
 Georg Meri, Estonian diplomat, literary scholar and translator
 Georg Pelisaar, Estonian journalist and politician
 Georg Ritter von Schönerer, Austrian politician
 Georg Schätzel (1875–1934), German jurist and politician
 Georg, Count Palatine of Simmern-Sponheim
 Georg, Crown Prince of Saxony
 Georg, Duke of Hohenberg
 Georg, Duke of Saxe-Altenburg
 Georg, Grand Duke of Mecklenburg-Strelitz
 Georg, Prince of Saxe-Meiningen
 Georg, Prince of Schaumburg-Lippe
 Georg, Prince of Schwarzburg-Rudolstadt
 Georg Leo Graf von Caprivi de Caprera de Montecuccoli, known as Leo von Caprivi, Chancellor of the German Empire

Other
 Georg Carl von Döbeln, Swedish soldier
 Georg Gänswein, German prelate of the Catholic Church
 Georg Hackenschmidt, Estonian strongman, professional wrestler and sports philosopher
 Georg Hellat, Estonian architect
 Georg Linnamäe, Estonian rally driver
 Georg Lurich, Estonian Greco-Roman wrestler and strongman  
 Georg Meri, Estonian diplomat, literary scholar and translator
 Georg Niedermeier, German association football player
 Georg Simmel, German thinker
 Georg Thomas, German military commander
 Georg, Truchsess von Waldburg, Swabian League army commander
 Georg Werthner, Austrian decathlete
 Spiders Georg, an Internet meme

See also

Georg (disambiguation)
George (disambiguation)
Örjan (given name)

German masculine given names
Estonian masculine given names
Danish masculine given names
Norwegian masculine given names